The 1905 college football season had the Chicago Maroons retroactively named as national champion by the Billingsley Report, the Helms Athletic Foundation, the National Championship Foundation, and the Houlgate System, while Yale was named champion by Parke H. Davis and Caspar Whitney.  Chicago finished the season 11–0, while Yale finished 10–0. The Official NCAA Division I Football Records Book listed both Chicago and Yale as having been selected national champions.

Conference and program changes

Membership changes

Notable games

Chicago vs. Michigan game

In the final game of the season on November 30, 1905, Amos Alonzo Stagg's Chicago team and Fielding Yost's Michigan squad met in a battle of undefeated Western Conference powerhouses.  The teams played at Chicago's Marshall Field in front of 27,000 spectators, at that time the largest crowd to view a football game.  Michigan was 12–0 and had a 56-game undefeated streak on the line, while Chicago was 10–0.

The game was a punting duel between Chicago's All-American Walter Eckersall and Michigan's John Garrels and was scoreless until early in the third quarter when a Michigan punt and Chicago penalty pinned Chicago inside their own ten-yard line. On third down, as Eckersall attempted to punt, he encountered a fearsome rush, but evaded the Michigan tacklers and was able to scramble to the 22-yard line and a first down. After three more first downs, the drive stalled and Chicago was forced to punt again. Eckersall's booming punt carried into the end zone where it was caught by Michigan's William Dennison Clark who attempted to run the ball out.  He advanced the ball forward to the one-yard line, but was hit hard by Art Badenoch and then was brought back inside his own end zone by Mark Catlin for a two-point safety. Under the rules of the time, forward progress was not credited, and a ball carrier could be carried backwards or forwards until he was down.  The rest of third and fourth quarters continued as a defensive stalemate.  Chicago's 2–0 victory snapped Michigan's 56-game unbeaten streak and gave Chicago the consensus national championship for 1905.

As a tragic note to this game, Clark received the blame for the Michigan loss, and in 1932 he shot himself through the heart. In a suicide note to his wife he reportedly expressed the hope that his "final play" would be of some benefit in atoning for his error at Marshall Field.

Night football
On October 6, 1905, the first night football game west of the Mississippi was played in Wichita, Kansas between Fairmount College (now Wichita State University and Cooper College (now Sterling College).  The Coleman Company provided lights for the game.

Rule experiment
On December 25, 1905, an experimental game was played in Wichita, Kansas between Fairmount College and Washburn University.  The game tested a rule change that required the offense to earn a first down in three plays instead of four.  Football legend John H. Outland officiated the game and commented, "It seems to me that the distance required in three downs would almost eliminate touchdowns, except through fakes or flukes."  The Los Angeles Times reported that there was much kicking and that the game was considered much safer than regular play, but that the new rule was not "conducive to the sport." Some of the rules for this game were based on the Burnside rules which govern the Canadian game.

Conference standings

Major conference standings

Independents

Minor conferences

Minor conference standings

Awards and honors

All-Americans

The consensus All-America team included:

See also
 1905 College Football All-America Team

References